Stef Vervoort (born 20 February 1995) is a Belgian professional football player who currently plays for KFC Oosterwijk. He plays as a midfielder.

Club career 

Vervoort made his top flight debut at 26 July 2014 against Lokeren in a 1–0 home win. He replaced Mohammed Aoulad after 80 minutes.

References

External links
 Stef Vervoort at Voetbalkrant
 

1995 births
Living people
Belgian footballers
K.V.C. Westerlo players
Belgian Pro League players
People from Lier, Belgium
Association football midfielders
Footballers from Antwerp Province